Turnau may refer to:

Turnau, German name for the Czech city of Turnov
Turnau, Styria, market town in Austria

People 
Grzegorz Turnau (born 1967), Polish composer, poet and singer

See also
Thurnau

German-language surnames